Andy Hewlett was an American football and basketball coach. He served as the head football coach at Washington College in Chestertown, Maryland in 1948 and Georgetown College in Georgetown, Kentucky in 1950. Hewlett was also the head basketball coach at Georgetown for one season, in 1950–51. He previously worked as the backfield coach for the Baltimore Colts of the All-America Football Conference (AAFC) in 1947.

References

Year of birth missing
Year of death missing
Baltimore Colts (1947–1950) coaches
Davidson Wildcats football players
Georgetown Tigers football coaches
Georgetown Tigers men's basketball coaches
Washington College Shoremen football coaches